The Children's and Family Emmy Awards, or Children's and Family Emmys, are a part of the extensive range of Emmy Awards for artistic and technical merit for the American television industry. Bestowed by the National Academy of Television Arts and Sciences (NATAS), the Children's and Family Emmys are presented in recognition of excellence in American children's and family-oriented television programming. The first ceremony took place on December 10 and 11, 2022, at Wilshire Ebell Theatre, Los Angeles. Awards for children's programming were previously presented at both the Daytime Emmys and the Primetime Emmys.

History 
Previously, the majority of Emmy Awards for children's television fell within the scope of the Daytime Emmy Awards, as organized by the National Academy of Television Arts and Sciences (NATAS). The 48th Daytime Creative Arts Emmy Awards introduced a new Outstanding Young Adult Series category as well.

The Primetime Emmy Awards organized by the Academy of Television Arts & Sciences (ATAS, also branded as the Television Academy) featured a non-competitive award for Outstanding Children's Program, which could be shared by multiple nominees that meet a specific voting threshold of academy members. This category was retired in 2020, with the Television Academy citing that the proliferation of streaming services had created confusion over whether children's programs should fall under the Daytime or Primetime awards; the category had already been modified to make primetime specials and spin-offs of a daytime children's program ineligible.

On November 17, 2021, the NATAS announced that it would create a new award presentation for children's and family television in 2022, the Children's and Family Emmy Awards, which would take over categories previously dispersed across the Daytime and Primetime Emmys. The organization cited an "explosive growth in the quantity and quality of children’s and family programming" as justification for a dedicated ceremony. The categories featured in the ceremony also include seven new categories for preschool television series.

The introduction of the ceremony is part of a larger re-alignment of the Primetime and Daytime Emmy Awards' eligibility criteria that begun in 2022, with eligibility for the ceremonies now based more on themes and stylistic characteristics rather than strictly the dayparts where a program airs on linear television.

Categories 
According to the official site, the following categories are set to be presented at the 2022 edition.

Program 
 Children's and Family Emmy Award for Outstanding Preschool Series
 Children's and Family Emmy Award for Outstanding Children's or Family Viewing Series
 Children's and Family Emmy Award for Outstanding Young Teen Series
 Outstanding Fiction Special
 Outstanding Non-Fiction Program
 Children's and Family Emmy Award for Outstanding Preschool Animated Series
 Children's and Family Emmy Award for Outstanding Animated Series
 Outstanding Special Class Animated Program
 Outstanding Short Form Program
 Outstanding Interactive Media
 Outstanding Promotional Announcement

Performer 
 Children's and Family Emmy Award for Outstanding Lead Performance
 Children's and Family Emmy Award for Outstanding Supporting Performance
 Outstanding Younger Performer in a Preschool, Children's or Young Teen Program
 Children's and Family Emmy Award for Outstanding Guest Performance
 Children's and Family Emmy Award for Outstanding Voice Performance in a Preschool Animated Program
 Children's and Family Emmy Award for Outstanding Voice Performance in an Animated Program
 Children's and Family Emmy Award for Outstanding Younger Voice Performer in an Animated or Preschool Animated Program
 Children's and Family Emmy Award for Outstanding Host

Writing 
 Outstanding Writing for a Live Action Preschool or Children's Program
 Outstanding Writing for a Young Teen Program
 Outstanding Writing for a Preschool Animated Program
 Outstanding Writing for an Animated Program

Directing 
 Outstanding Directing for a Single Camera Program
 Outstanding Directing for a Multiple Camera Program
 Outstanding Directing for a Preschool Animated Program
 Outstanding Directing for an Animated Program
 Outstanding Voice Directing for an Animated Series

Crafts 
 Outstanding Music Direction and Composition for a Live Action Program
 Outstanding Music Direction and Composition for an Animated Program
 Outstanding Original Song
 Outstanding Lighting Design for a Live Action Program
 Outstanding Cinematography for a Live Action Single-Camera Program
 Outstanding Cinematography for a Live Action Multiple-Camera Program
 Outstanding Editing for a Single Camera Program
 Outstanding Editing for Multiple Camera Program
 Outstanding Editing for a Preschool Animated Program
 Outstanding Editing for an Animated Program
 Outstanding Sound Mixing and Sound Editing for a Live Action Program
 Outstanding Sound Mixing and Sound Editing for a Preschool Animated Program
 Outstanding Sound Editing and Sound Mixing for an Animated Program
 Outstanding Visual Effects for a Live Action Program
 Outstanding Main Title and Graphics
 Outstanding Casting for a Live-Action Program
 Outstanding Casting for an Animated Program
 Outstanding Art Direction/Set Decoration/Scenic Design
 Outstanding Costume Design/Styling
 Outstanding Hairstyling and Makeup
 Outstanding Special Effects Costumes, Hair and Makeup
 Outstanding Choreography
 Outstanding Stunt Coordination for a Live Action Program

Individual achievement
 Individual Achievement in Animation

List of ceremonies

References

External links
 

 
Emmy Awards
Awards established in 2021
2021 establishments in the United States